Asli is a Turkish unisex given name. It is derived from the Turkish noun aslı whose meanings include genuine, authentic, and the essence. It is used as a nickname for the heroine in the 16th-century Turkic tale "Kerem ile Aslı" after the hero asks her ""Why do you want me to leave you? What is the essence of your wish?” (“Aslı” means “essence”).

Given name

First name
 Aslı Bayram (born 1981), German actress and model of Turkish descent
 Aslı Bekiroğlu (born 1995), Turkish actress
 Aslı Canan Sabırlı (born 1991), Turkish women's footballer
 Aslı Çakır Alptekin (born 1985), Turkish Olympic gold medalist middle distance runner
 Aslı Duman (born 1992), Turkish water polo player
 Aslı Enver (born 1984), Turkish actress
 Aslı Erdoğan (born 1967), Turkish writer
 Aslı Gökyokuş (born 1977), Turkish singer
 Aslı Güngör (born 1979), Turkish pop singer
 Aslı İskit (born 1993), Turkish handball player
 Aslı Kalaç (born 1995), Turkish volleyball player
 Aslı Melisa Uzun (born 1995), Turkish actress and beauty pageant titleholder
 Aslı Perker (born 1975), Turkish journalist
 Aslı Tandoğan (born 1979), Turkish actress

Middle name
 Ceyda Aslı Kılıçkıran (born 1968), Turkish screenwriter and film director
 Melisa Aslı Pamuk (born 1991), Dutch-Turkish beauty pageant titleholder

References